Stenocrepis tibialis is a species of beetle in the family Carabidae. It is found in the Caribbean, Argentina, Brazil, Guatemala, Ecuador, Mexico, and the U.S. state of Texas.

References

Further reading

External links

 

Harpalinae
Beetles described in 1834
Taxa named by Louis Alexandre Auguste Chevrolat